Easthouses is a settlement in Midlothian, Scotland, lying to the east of Newtongrange and south of Dalkeith. It forms the northern extension of the settlement of Mayfield, with which it is closely associated; the two communities have a combined population of around 7,900.

Primarily based on public housing, Easthouses developed in the 1920s to accommodate miners for the nearby Easthouses Colliery, many of whom relocated from the west of Scotland. The settlement was significantly extended in the 1950s. Employment has diversified since the closure of local mines, with many of the population now commuting to Edinburgh.

The Easthouses Parish Church (built 1954) is of minor architectural interest.

See also
 Newbattle Community High School
 Easthouses Lily Miners Welfare F.C.
 Murder of Jodi Jones

References

External links

 Easthouses at Gazetteer for Scotland

Villages in Midlothian
Mining communities in Scotland